The Tour de Condroz was a Belgian cycling race organized for the last time in 1978.

With Brussels as starting place, the major part of the course was situated in the Condroz region of the Ardennes, Liège. Nandrin was the finish place. 

The competition's roll of honor includes the successes of Freddy Maertens and Eddy Merckx. The record of victories, however, belongs to Victor Van Schil.

Winners

References 

Cycle races in Belgium
1959 establishments in Belgium
Defunct cycling races in Belgium
Recurring sporting events established in 1959
Recurring sporting events disestablished in 1978
1978 disestablishments in Belgium